The National Party was a party in the Isle of Man that associated itself with the British Conservatives.  They were active in the period between World War I and World War II in opposing the activities of the Manx Labour Party. However, unlike the Manx Labour Party, they were unsuccessful in establishing themselves over the longer term and they folded.

Separatism in the Isle of Man
Secessionist organizations in Europe
Celtic nationalism
National Party
Defunct political parties in the Isle of Man
Conservative parties in the United Kingdom